

Competitions

Divizia A

League table

Results by round

Results summary

Matches

Cupa României

Players

Transfers

In

Out

See also

 1997–98 Divizia A
 1997–98 Cupa României
 1997–98 UEFA Cup

References

ASC Oțelul Galați seasons
Oțelul, Galați, ACS